The 1998 Marlboro Masters of Formula 3 was the eighth Masters of Formula 3 race held at Circuit Park Zandvoort on 9 August 1998. It was won by David Saelens, for ASM Fina.

Drivers and teams

Format changes
With an entry of 47 cars, race organisers changed the format of qualifying to allow every driver a shot at qualifying for the Marlboro Masters itself. The field would be split into two groups; one for even-numbered cars and one for odd-numbered cars. Then there would be a qualifying session for each group, with that setting the grid for each group's qualification race. Each qualification race would see the top fourteen cars progressing through to the Marlboro Masters itself, with the pole position being awarded to the winner of the qualification race that was won in the quickest time. The remaining four cars would be made up from the highest qualifying drivers left.

Classification

Qualifying

Group A

Group B

Qualification Race

Group A

Group B

Race

References

Masters of Formula Three
Masters of Formula Three
Masters of Formula 3
Masters of Formula Three